Champa is a former kingdom located in what is now south and central Vietnam.

Champa may also refer to:

Books
 Champa (novel), Nepali-language novel written by Laxmi Prasad Devkota

People
 Champa (actress), Bangladeshi film actress
 Chandrashekhar Patil, Kannada-language writer known as 'Champa'
 Changpa, a semi-nomadic Tibetan people

Fictional characters
  is the God of Destruction from Universe 6 and is Beerus' twin brother that appears in Dragon Ball Super.

Places

India
 Janjgir–Champa, district of Chhattisgarh
 Janjgir-Champa Lok Sabha constituency, parliamentary constituency of India
 Champa, Chhattisgarh, city in the district
 Champa, Madhubani, village in Bihar
 Champapuri, also known as Champa, ancient Indian city, now in Bihar

Others

Flowers
 Plumeria is a small genus of 7-8 species. Plumeria alba is called "champa" in Laos and parts of India.
 Magnolia champaca known for its strongly fragrant yellow or white flowers.

Films
 Champa (film), an Indian Assamese Language film

See also
Chamba (disambiguation)
Champ (disambiguation)
Champagne (disambiguation)